This is the discography of American singer Yvonne Elliman.

Albums

Studio albums

Compilation albums

EPs

Singles

Contributions

Notes

References

Discographies of American artists
Pop music discographies